The following is a complete list of rulers of the Mbunda Kingdom, established in the southeast of present-day Angola, covering Moxico and Cuando Cubango Provinces.

Early monarchs

Mbunda Kingdom in south-eastern Angola

Migration to Moxico and Cuando Cubango

Gallery

See also
Mbunda Kingdom
Mbunda language
Mbunda people
List of Mbunda Chiefs in Zambia

References

Further reading
 Abshire, D.M. and Michael Samuels, eds, Angola Handbook, London, 1965,
 Bull, M.M. Bulozi Under the Luyana Kings, London, 1973]
 Davidson, Basil, In the Eye of the Storm: Angola's People, New York, 1973,
 Duffy, J. Portuguese West Africa, Cambridge, 1961,
 White, C.M.N. Notes on the Political Organisation of the Kabompo District and its Inhabitants, African Studies, IX, (1950), pp. 185–93.
 José Redinha, Etnias e Culturas de Angola, Luanda: Instituto de Investigação Científica, 1975; reprinted fac-simile by the Associação das Universidades de Língua Portuguesa, 2009, 

Ethnic groups in Angola
Ethnic groups in Zambia
Mbunda Kingdom
Mbunda Kingdom